Attack Squadron 176 (VA-176), known as the "Thunderbolts", was a United States Navy carrier-based medium attack squadron that saw combat service in the Vietnam War and later in 1983 in both Grenada and Lebanon.

History
VA-176 was established on 4 June 1955 and equipped with the Douglas AD-6 Skyraider and assigned to the Atlantic Fleet. A year later the first deployment followed on board the aircraft carrier  to the Mediterranean Sea as part of Air Task Group 2 (ATG-2). In 1958, the squadron was assigned to Carrier Air Group 17 (CVG-17), but was not deployed as CVG-17 was disbanded.

During the 1966 deployment two members of the squadron became known by successfully engaging a Vietnam People's Air Force MiG-17, an unusual instance of propeller-driven aircraft defeating a jet-powered adversary. 

This was the last cruise with the Douglas A-1H Skyraider, as the squadron converted to the Grumman A-6A Intruder all-weather attack plane. From its first deployment with the Intruder in 1970 to the last in 1991, VA-176 was assigned to CVW-6. Flying the Intruder, VA-176 made eighteen deployments to the Mediterranean Sea, three of which also led to the Indian Ocean. The squadron earned three consecutive Battle "E" awards, for the years 1988-1991. The squadron was decommissioned from active service on 30 October 1992.

Aircraft
 Douglas AD-6 Skyraider (after 1962 A-1H) — 1955–1967
 Douglas A-4 Skyhawk
 Grumman A-6A Intruder —  1969–1975
 Grumman KA-6D Intruder — 1972–1992
 Grumman A-6C Intruder — 1973–1975
 Grumman A-6E Intruder — 1975–1992

See also
History of the United States Navy
List of inactive United States Navy aircraft squadrons
List of United States Navy aircraft squadrons

External links

 VA-176's Official Website

Military units and formations established in 1955
Attack squadrons of the United States Navy
1955 establishments in the United States